The following is a timeline of the history of the city of Cagliari, Sardinia, Italy.

Prior to 18th century

 2nd. half of the 4th millennium BCE - The territory of Cagliari is inhabited by people of the so-called neolithic civilization of Ozieri. Some Domus de Janas were dug in Mount Saint Elias
 2nd. half of the 3rd millennium BCE - The territory of Cagliari is the core of the Chalcolithic civilization of Monte Claro
 8th C. BCE - Caralis founded by Phoenicians from Tyre, Lebanon.
 510 BCE - Caralis occupied by the Cartaginians
 238 BCE - Caralis occupied by the Romans
 Early 1st C. CE - Granting of the title of Municipium
 2nd C. CE - Roman Amphitheatre of Cagliari built.
 5th C. CE - Roman Catholic diocese of Cagliari established (approximate date).
 5th C. CE - Basilica of San Saturnino built.
 485 - Vandals in power in Sardinia.(it)
 533 - Sardinia taken by forces of Justinian I.
 10th C. - The title of imperial Protospatharios is granted to the Iudex Sardiniae Turcoturios (Tουρκοτούριος), resident in Caralis, by the Byzantine emperors.
 1020 - Giudicato of Cagliari established.
 1297 - Pope Boniface VIII invests the Kings of Aragon with Sardinia.
 1305 - Torre di San Pancrazio (tower) built.
 1307 - Torre dell'Elefante (tower) built.
 1312 - Cagliari Cathedral built.
 1323 -  begins during the Aragonese conquest of Sardinia.
 1325
 December: .
 Shrine of Our Lady of Bonaria construction begins.
 1326 - Siege of Castel di Castro ends; Aragonese in power.
 1348 - Black Death plague.
 1492 - Jews in Sardinia expelled per Alhambra Decree.(it)
 1606 - University of Cagliari established.
 1688 - Population: 17,390.(it)

18th-19th centuries
 1714 - Aragonese ousted; Sardinia "assigned to Austria" per Treaty of Utrecht.
 1720 - Sardinia ceded by the Austrians to the duke of Savoy, in exchange for Sicily.
 1764 -  built.
 1792 -  (library) opens.
 1793 - Cagliari "bombarded by the French fleet."
 1804 - Reale Società Agraria ed Economica di Cagliari (learned society founded.
 1821 - Population: 31,935.(it)
 1840 -  (garden) opens.
 1859 -  (administrative region) established.
 1871 -  begins operating.
 1879 - Cagliari railway station opens.
 1883 -  (railway) begins operating.
 1889 - L'Unione Sarda newspaper begins publication.
 1893
  begin operating.
 Popolo Sardo newspaper begins publication.
 1897 - Population: 44,624.

20th century

 1901 -  terrace built.
 1911 - Population: 60,101.
 1920 - Cagliari Football Club formed.
 1923 - Stadio Amsicora (stadium) opens.
 1931 - Population: 92,689.(it)
 1933 -  built.
 1943 - Bombing of Cagliari in World War II.
 1948 -  (fair) begins.
 1951 - Population: 130,511.(it)
 1952 - Trolleybuses in Cagliari begin operating.
 1961 - Population: 173,540.(it)
 1965 -  begins publication.
 1970 - Stadio Sant'Elia (stadium) opens.
 1981 - Population: 219,648.(it)
 1990 - Part of 1990 FIFA World Cup football contest held in Cagliari.
 1993 -  (museum) active.

21st century

 2001 - Population: 164,249.(it)
 2008 - Cagliari light rail begins operating.
 2011
 Local election held; Massimo Zedda becomes mayor.(it)
 2013 - Population: 149,575.

See also
 History of Cagliari
 List of mayors of Cagliari
 List of bishops of Cagliari
 List of giudici of Caligari, 11th-13th centuries
 History of Sardinia
 Timelines of other cities in the macroregion of Insular Italy:(it) Sicily: Catania, Messina, Palermo, Syracuse, Trapani

References

This article incorporates information from the Italian Wikipedia.

Bibliography

in English

in Italian
  (List of newspapers)

External links

  (city archives)
 Archivio di Stato di Cagliari (state archives)
 Items related to Cagliari, various dates (via Europeana)
 Items related to Cagliari, various dates (via Digital Public Library of America)

History of Cagliari
Cagliari